Birender Singh may refer to:

 Birender Singh (politician, born 1921) (1921–2009), Indian politician
 Birender Singh (politician, born 1946), Indian politician